Hatem Mohamed  (born 1 January 2002) is an Egyptian professional footballer who plays as a defender for Zamalek.

Career statistics

Club

References

External links 

2002 births
Living people
Egyptian footballers
Association football defenders
Zamalek SC players
Egyptian Premier League players